Local elections were held in Malta on 6 June 2009, the same day of the European elections. The elections were held in 23 of the 68 Maltese localities. These 23 localities are: Imdina (Città Notabile), Bormla (Città Cospicua), Rabat, Gozo, Żabbar (Città Hompesch), Birkirkara, Fgura, Gudja, Għarb, Għaxaq, Kalkara, Lija, Marsaskala, Mġarr, Msida, Imtarfa, Naxxar, Pietà, Malta, Rabat, Malta, San Ġwann, Sannat, Tas-Sliema, Tarxien, and Xgħajra.

Candidates

In total, 272 candidates contested for this election, 133 for Partit Laburista (PL), as well as for Partit Nazzjonalista (PN), three for Alternattiva Demokratika (AD), and other three as independents. The independent candidates contested respectively in Mġarr, Tarxien and Mtarfa. A party grouping Għall-Imtarfa Aħjar (For Better Mtarfa) contested the election in Mtarfa only.

Voter turnout

Results

References

2009
2009 elections in Europe
2009 in Malta
June 2009 events in Europe